Spurrell's woolly bat (Kerivoula phalaena) is a species of vesper bat in the family Vespertilionidae named after Herbert George Flaxman Spurrell.
It is found in Cameroon, Democratic Republic of the Congo, Ivory Coast, Ghana, Guinea, Liberia, and Uganda.
Its natural habitats are subtropical or tropical dry forests, subtropical or tropical moist lowland forests, and subtropical or tropical moist montane forests.

References

Kerivoulinae
Taxonomy articles created by Polbot
Mammals described in 1912
Taxa named by Oldfield Thomas
Bats of Africa